This is the discography of the American singer-songwriter Ryan Adams.

Studio albums

Solo

Whiskeytown

1995: Faithless Street
1997: Strangers Almanac
2001: Pneumonia (recorded 1999)

Other albums
2003: The Finger, We Are Fuck You

Live albums

Solo

EPs

Whiskeytown
1995: Angels
1997: Theme for a Trucker
1997: Rural Free Delivery
1997: In Your Wildest Dreams

Solo

Singles

Other charted songs

Music videos

Promos
 2002: Answering Bell (Live at the Paradiso) (CD)
 2003: Hey Parker, It's Christmas (Promo 7")
 2003: Come Pick Me Up (4-Track version) (Promo 7")
 2004: Halloween (Promo CD)
 2004: Now That You're Gone (7")
 2004: The Rescue Blues (Double 7")
 2004: California (Double 7")
 2009: Oblivion (7")
 2011: Do I Wait/Darkness (7")
 2011: Empty Room/Nutshell (7")
 2011: Come Home/Starsign (7")
 2014: Jacksonville/I Keep Running/Walkedypants (Limited Edition 7")
 2014: Vampires (7")
 2014: Do You Laugh When You Lie? (7")
 2015: No Shadow (7")
 2015: Blue Light (7")
 2015: I Do Not Feel Like Being Good (7")
 2015: Willow Lane/Yes Or Run/Red Hot Blues (7')
 2015: Burn in the Night/Cop City/Look in the Mirror (7')

Box sets
2012: Live After Deaf
2015: Live at Carnegie Hall

Other contributions
2002: Hear Music Volume 7: Waking (Hear Music) – "When the Stars Go Blue"
2002: Rise Above: 24 Black Flag Songs to Benefit the West Memphis Three (Sanctuary Records)  – "Nervous Breakdown"
2006: The Acoustic Album (Virgin) – "Wonderwall"
2012: The Kitty Compilation (compilation cassette) (Burger Records) - Dynasty of Troll Loch Ming

Notes

References

Discography
Rock music discographies
Discographies of American artists
Country music discographies